Wakatipu Rugby Club is a rugby union club in Queenstown, New Zealand. The club was established in 1953 and is a member of the Otago Rugby Football Union

In 2022, due to the COVID-19 pandemic, New Zealand teams during the 2022 Super Rugby Pacific season went into bio-bubbles in Queenstown, New Zealand for the opening three rounds of the season. This meant eight matches were relocated to the Otago and Southland area, originally to Rugby Park in Invercargill and Wakatipu Rugby Club, before night matches were confirmed for Forsyth Barr Stadium, Dunedin instead. As the only rugby stadium in Queenstown, Wakatipu Rugby Club is currently scheduled to host 3 day matches in the opening 3 rounds, the first time the venue will have hosted an official Super Rugby match.

References

Rugby union stadiums in New Zealand